is a Japanese voice actress and singer managed by Style Cube. She was formerly part of Up-Front Agency in which she was involved with Happy! Style and Team Dekaris. She was affiliated with Sigma Seven from 2013 to 2017. She was a member of StylipS until April 2013, alongside YuiKaori and Yui Ogura. As a solo singer, she recorded several character songs for one of each characters. A couple of singles have charted on Oricon.

Career 
She made her first single, "Blooming Flower", at Pony Canyon. It peaked at 12th place on the Oricon Weekly Singles Chart and stayed on the chart for three weeks. She released her second single, "Ray Rule" and peaked at 13th place on Oricon on July 11, 2018. In the same year, she released her first solo album titled "Sunny Spot" on November 14. It peaked at 13th place on Oricon Albums Chart. She held her first solo live titled "Sunny Spot Story" on December 29, 2018. A Blu-ray and DVD version of the concert was released on April 17, 2019. She released her third single titled "TEMPEST" on July 17, 2019. It was used as the opening theme song for the anime, Demon Lord, Retry!.

Filmography

Television animation

Film
 Pop in Q (2016) as Ruchia
 Digimon Adventure tri. (2017) as Bakumon
 Happy-Go-Lucky Days (2020) as Mika-chan
 My Tyrano: Together, Forever (2020)

OVA
 Code Geass: Akito the Exiled as Alice Shaing
 Senran Kagura Estival Versus OVA as Yozakura
 Kaijuu Girls (Black) as Nova

Video games
2011
 Hyperdimension Neptunia Mk2, Ram
 Food Fantasy, Candy Cane, Margarita, White Truffle
2012
 Mugen Souls, Welsh
 Hyperdimension Neptunia Victory, Ram
2013
 Super Danganronpa Another 2, Hibiki Otonokoji
 Disgaea D2: A Brighter Darkness, Sicily
 Exstetra, Shiho
 Fairy Fencer F, Tiara
 Mugen Souls Z, Welsh
 Hyperdimension Neptunia Re;Birth1, Ram
 Senran Kagura Shinovi Versus, Yozakura
 Sorcery Saga: Curse of the Great Curry God, Punī
 Hyperdimension Neptunia: Producing Perfection, Ram
 Ys: Memories of Celceta, Carna
2014
 Hyperdevotion Noire: Goddess Black Heart, Tiara 
 Hyperdimension Neptunia Re;Birth2: Sisters Generation, Ram
 Dekamori Senran Kagura, Yozakura
 Super Heroine Chronicle, Reki
2015
 Senran Kagura: Estival Versus – Yozakura
 Shironeko Project, Shizuku Enju
 Megadimension Neptunia VII, Ram
 Fairy Fencer F Advent Dark Force, Tiara
2016
 Granblue Fantasy, Juliet
2017
 Digimon Story: Cyber Sleuth – Hacker's Memory - Wormmon/Sistermon Noir
 Magia Record: Puella Magi Madoka Magica Side Story - Rena Minami
 Xenoblade Chronicles 2 - Floren (Japanese: ホタル, Hotaru)
 School Girl/Zombie Hunter, Rei Kanazaki
2019
 Arknights, Heavyrain
2020
 Moe! Ninja Girls RPG, Oka Kazamatsuri
2022
 Fairy Fencer F: Refrain Chord, Tiara
 Goddess of Victory: Nikke, Frima
 Return to Shironagasu Island, Akira Edgworth
 Neptunia: Sisters vs Sisters, Ram

Dubbing
 Planzet (2010) as Koyomi Akejima
 Long Way North as Nadya

Discography

Singles

Albums

Video Releases

Concerts

Personal concerts

Other concerts

References

External links
  
  
  
 

1993 births
Living people
Japanese female idols
Japanese video game actresses
Japanese voice actresses
Japanese women pop singers
Musicians from Chiba Prefecture
Sigma Seven voice actors
StylipS members
Voice actresses from Chiba Prefecture
YuiKaori members
21st-century Japanese actresses
21st-century Japanese women singers
21st-century Japanese singers